Pachyiulus cattarensis is a species of millipede from Julidae family that can be found in Bulgaria, Greece and all states of former Yugoslavia (except Slovenia).

References

Julida
Animals described in 1884
Millipedes of Europe